In mathematics,  the Plücker map embeds the Grassmannian , whose elements are k-dimensional subspaces of an n-dimensional vector space V, in a projective space, thereby realizing it as an algebraic variety. More precisely, the Plücker map embeds  into the projectivization 
The image is algebraic, consisting of the intersection of a number of quadrics defined by the Plücker relations (see below).

The Plücker embedding was first defined by  Julius Plücker in the case   as a way of describing the lines in three-dimensional space (which, as projective lines in real projective space, correspond to two-dimensional subspaces of a four-dimensional vector space). The image of that embedding is the Klein quadric in RP5.

Hermann Grassmann generalized Plücker's embedding to arbitrary k and n.

Definition 
Denoting by   the -dimensional vector space over the field , and by

This is an embedding of the Grassmannian into the projectivization . The image can be completely characterized as the intersection of a number of quadrics, the Plücker quadrics (see below), which are expressed by homogeneous quadratic relations on the  Plücker coordinates (see below) that derive from linear algebra.

The bracket ring appears as the ring of polynomial functions on the exterior power.

Plücker relations 
The embedding of the Grassmannian satisfies some very simple quadratic relations usually called the Plücker relations, or Grassmann–Plücker relations. To state the Grassmann–Plücker relations, let  be the -dimensional subspace  spanned by the basis of column vectors . 
Let  be the   matrix of homogeneous coordinates, 
For any ordered sequence  
They are the linear coordinates of the image  of 
 under the Plücker map, relative to the standard basis in the exterior space .

For any two ordered sequences: 

of positive integers , the following homogeneous equations are valid, and determine the image of   under the Plücker map:

where  denotes
the sequence  with
the term  omitted. 

 
the image of  under the Plücker map is defined by the single equation

although these are not, in general, algebraically independent.

References

Further reading
 

Algebraic geometry
Differential geometry